The Buildings at 1301–03 and 1305–07 Judson Avenue are two identical apartment buildings in Evanston, Illinois. Built in 1894, the buildings were among Evanston's first multi-unit apartments. Each building has four units which form a "U" shape. Architect Sidney Smith designed the buildings in the Queen Anne style, which was popular in the late nineteenth century and used in many houses in the vicinity of the apartments. The buildings each feature a brick first floor and shingled second floor, a single porch with two entrances, bay windows, and a bracketed cornice.

The buildings were added to the National Register of Historic Places on April 27, 1984. Despite being identical, the buildings are listed separately.

References

Buildings and structures on the National Register of Historic Places in Cook County, Illinois
Residential buildings on the National Register of Historic Places in Illinois
Buildings and structures in Evanston, Illinois
Residential buildings completed in 1894
Queen Anne architecture in Illinois
Apartment buildings in Illinois